= Charles Wathier =

American politician

Charles A Wathier was an undertaker and politician in Illinois. He represented Cook County, Illinois in the Illinois Senate. He represented District 14 in Chicago.

He served on the Board of Equalization. A Republican, his address was listed as 365 Fifth Avenue in Chicago in 1897. Another address listed for him was 629 South Wells Street.
